David Eugene "Moose" Morissette (born December 24, 1971) is a Canadian retired professional ice hockey left winger and enforcer who played 11 games in the National Hockey League for the Montreal Canadiens.

Career
Morissette played Junior hockey, for the Shawinigan Cataractes of the QMJHL, for whom he was a 1st round draft pick in the 1988 QMJHL Entry draft. He played for the Cataractes for 3 seasons, totaling 72 points and 789 PIMs in 196 games. Following the 1990–91 season he was selected in the 1991 NHL Entry Draft by the Washington Capitals, 146th overall.

He turned professional the following season, playing for both of the Capitals farm teams, the Hampton Roads Admirals and Baltimore Skipjacks. Morissette would play in the ECHL for 3 seasons for both the Skipjacks and the Roanoke Express before joining the Minnesota Moose of the IHL for the 1994–95 season. He would play for one season in Roanoke, before joining the Houston Aeros for the 1996–97 season, for whom he also played for 2 years. During this time, he also dressed for the Austin Ice Bats of the WPHL.

Over the course of the 1998–99 season Morissette primarily played for the Fredericton Canadiens of the AHL, however, he also played 10 games for the Montreal Canadiens, during which time he fought notable heavyweights including Bob Probert, Gino Odjick and Rob Ray. The following season, Morissette would again play for the Habs' AHL affiliate, this time the Quebec Citadelles, and was called up once to play for the Habs. In his final season in hockey Morissette played Lake Charles Ice Pirates of the WPHL before moving overseas to play for the London Knights in the BISL.

Post-playing career
Following the culmination of his professional Hockey career, Morissette now works as a TV presenter for TVA Sports where he hosts 'Dave Morissette en Direct'. He has won six Artis Awards for his presenting work. As of 2018, Morissette has been a spokesperson for Réno-Dépôt.

Morissette's son Zack also plays hockey, and was selected in the 2019 QMJHL Entry Draft by the Baie-Comeau Drakkar.

Career Statistics

Regular season and playoffs

References

External links

1971 births
Living people
Austin Ice Bats (WPHL) players
Baltimore Skipjacks players
Canadian ice hockey left wingers
Fredericton Canadiens players
Hampton Roads Admirals players
Houston Aeros (1994–2013) players
Ice hockey people from Quebec
Lake Charles Ice Pirates players
London Knights (UK) players
Minnesota Moose players
Montreal Canadiens players
Ottawa Senators announcers
People from Baie-Comeau
Quebec Citadelles players
Roanoke Express players
Shawinigan Cataractes players
Washington Capitals draft picks
Canadian expatriate ice hockey players in England